= Sirous Namazi =

Iranian born Swedish artist

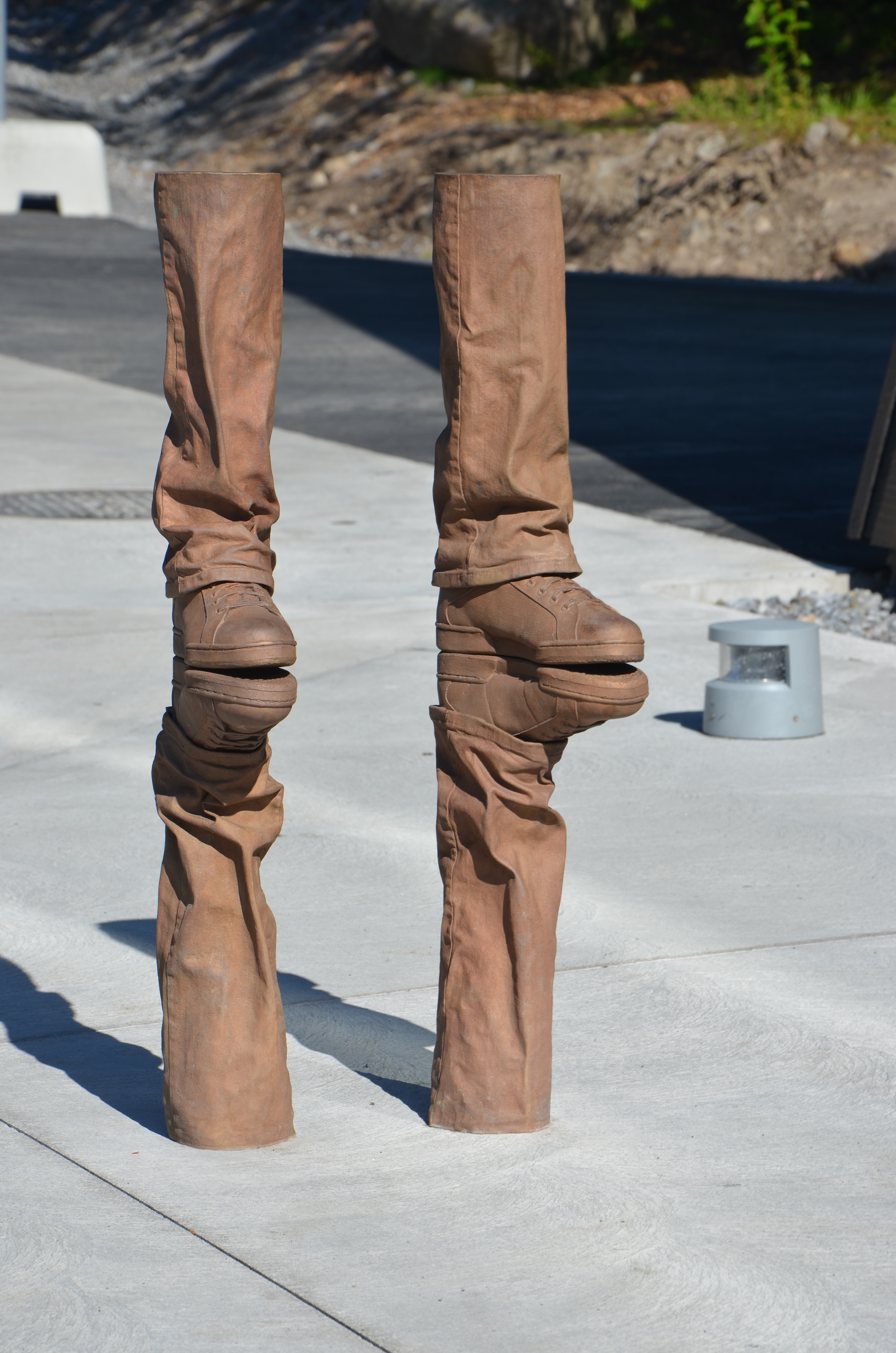
- Sirous Namazi´s sculpture Ben, bronze, 2012, outside the entrance ot the Art Museum Artipelag, Gustavsberg, Sweden
- Born: 1970 (age 55–56); Iran
- Education: Forum Art School Malmö; School of Art Malmö
- Known for: Conceptual art Installation art Video art Painting; Sculpture
- Notable work: Sirous Telling Jokes (1996); Leaning Horizontal (2012); Periphery III (2012); Leaning Horizontal II (2018); Container (2019)

Sirous Namazi (born 1970) is an Iranian born Swedish artist known for his largescale installations.

== Early life ==
Namazi moved to Sweden from Iran when he was 10-years-old. He was trained at the Forum Art School in Malmö and, subsequently, the School of Art in Malmö.

== Work ==
Namazi has exhibited at the Venice Biennale in (2007) and the Biennale in Athens (2018). They have held solo exhibitions at Örebro Konsthall (2018), Lunds Konsthall (2007), and Moderna Museet (2003).

His work, Leaning Horizontal is an installation consisting of a dishevelled ICA Supermarket shelf tipped to an angle of 45 degrees.

Periphery III is a balcony with satellite dish mounted high up on a telephone pylon.The work is using the symbol of a suburban balcony, with an observation point of the local neighbourhood, to showcase the more distant world in focus coming in through the satellite dish.

== Public art ==
Namazi created a permanent public artwork, Reconstruction, for the Court of Appeals building in Umeå.

== Collections ==
Namazi's work is held in the permanent collection of the Moderna Museet, and the Magazin III Museum for Contemporary Art which holds several of his works.

== Personal life ==
Namazi lives and works in Stockholm.
